Hallvard Skauge (born 11 September 1945) is a Norwegian illustrator.

He holds a cand.mag. degree from the University of Oslo, and started illustrating for the newspaper Klassekampen in 1970. His signature is "M". He has also worked for Nynorsk Pressekontor, Nationen, Dagens Næringsliv, LO-aktuelt and Journalisten. He won the Editorial Cartoon of the Year award in 2009. He has also illustrated books.

References

1945 births
Living people
Norwegian illustrators
Norwegian editorial cartoonists
University of Oslo alumni